Carla Patricia Padilla Eve (born 9 May 1988) is a Bolivian footballer who played as a midfielder for the Bolivia women's national team.

Early life
Padilla hails from the Santa Cruz Department.

International career
Padilla represented Bolivia at the 2004 South American U-19 Women's Championship. At senior level, she played two Copa América Femenina editions (2006 and 2010) and the 2014 South American Games.

International goals
Scores and results list Bolivia's goal tally first

References

1988 births
Living people
Women's association football midfielders
Bolivian women's footballers
People from Santa Cruz Department (Bolivia)
Bolivia women's international footballers
Competitors at the 2014 South American Games